Mirissala is a village in Sri Lanka. It is located within North Western Province.

See also
List of settlements in North Western Province (Sri Lanka)

External links

Populated places in North Western Province, Sri Lanka